The 2015 12U Baseball World Cup was an under-12 international baseball tournament held from July 23 to August 2 in Taipei City, Taiwan.

Teams 
Twelve teams qualified for the tournament. The number in parentheses is their nations ranking in the WBSC World Rankings prior to the start of the tournament.

First round

Group A

Group B

2nd Round

Super Round

Consolation Round

Medal Rounds 
Both the Gold and Bronze medal game were played at Tainan Municipal Stadium in Tainan.

Bronze-medal game

Gold-medal game

Final rankings

See also
 List of sporting events in Taiwan

References

U-12 Baseball World Cup
U-12 Baseball World Cup
International baseball competitions hosted by Taiwan
U-12 Baseball World Cup
U-12 Baseball World Cup
U-12 Baseball World Cup
U-12 Baseball World Cup
Sports competitions in Taipei
2010s in Taipei